The Kamaldah Jain temple, located in Patna, Bihar, is one of the oldest Jain temples.

History 
Kamaldah Jain temple is believed to built on the site where Jain acharya Sthulabhadra (297—198 BCE) spent his last days. Sthulabhadra, the founder of Śvētāmbara sect of Jainism, along with Bhadrabahu was the spiritual teacher of Chandragupta Maurya. The temple was built in 1729 CE (V.S. 1848) to commemorate the Sthulabhadra. The temple houses an inscription dating back to 1792 CE.

Architecture 
Kamaldah Jain temple is built on a brick mound. The temple features an illustration of Sthulabhadra. The second temple is dedicated to Sudarshana. The temple houses black stone foot prints of Sudarshana to which saffron is applied daily as offering. The door of the temple has an image of Bhairava. The temple is an important pilgrimage site for Jains and is part of Jain circuit of bihar.

Conservation 
The Government of Bihar has included this temple along with Agam Kuan, Durakhi devi temple, Begu Hajjam's Mosque, Golghar, and Takht Sri Patna Sahib.

References

Citations

Sources

External links 
 

Jain temples in Bihar
18th-century Jain temples